The Service de police de la Ville de Montréal (SPVM) is the municipal police agency for the city of Montreal, Quebec, Canada, and the neighbouring communities in the urban agglomeration of Montreal. With over 4,500 officers and more than 1,300 civilian staff, it is the second-largest municipal police agency in Canada after the Toronto Police Service.

History
The Montreal Police Service was created on March 15, 1843. At that time, there were 51 police officers in Montreal. The first officers did not wear uniforms. In order to be recognizable as police officers by civilians, the first uniforms were created in 1848. In 1853, they won the right to carry firearms in the performance of their duties.

In the early twentieth century, the Montreal Police Service counted 467 constables, inspectors and managers. The force was subdivided, as squads of morality and local departments were created.

The size of the police force remained roughly the same from the beginning of the century until 1930, when it hired more staff in the context of the Wall Street Crash of 1929. During the Great Depression, tens of thousands of workers lost their jobs and there was an increase in crime. In the late 1930s, the Montreal Police Service had about 1,500 employees.

Following the progress of scientific analysis, a mobile laboratory was created in 1957. It evolved and changed in the 1980s to become the technical section.

The Museum of the Montreal Police was established in 1992 to preserve the history of the Montreal Police Service.

Leadership

The following is a list of Chiefs and Directors of the Service de police de la Ville de Montréal.

Organization

The SPVM is led by Fady Dagher, Director (chief of police), who took over in January 2023 from Sophie Roy, who was in an interim position after Sylvain Caron retired.

The rank structure and strength of the SPVM as of 2019 was:
 Director (1)
 Assistant Director (6)
 Chief Inspector (15)
 Inspector (25)
 Commandant (68)
 Lieutenant (47) and Detective Lieutenant (76)
 Sergeant (365) and Detective Sergeant (641)
 Constable (3,318)

Some of the police functions carried out by the service include:
 Patrol police officers
 Intervention officers (GI, Riot police) (now called SSIS Section Support et Intervention Spécialisé)
 Tactical response officers (SWAT)
 Motorcycle officers
 Community relations officers
 Physical surveillance officers (shadowing)
 Section chiefs
 Investigators
 K-9 unit officers
 Mounted patrol officers
 Marine patrol officers
 Patrol supervisors
 Parking enforcement officers

The SPVM also has over 1,000 civilian employees, and around 200 police cadets.

Ranks
Executive Officers
 Director (Directeur): three gold fleur-de-lis under crest over a crossed gold sword and baton; similar to the insignia of a lieutenant-general in the Canadian Army
 Associate Director (Directeur-Adjoint): two gold fleur-de-lis under crest over a crossed gold sword and baton; similar to the insignia of a major-general in the Canadian Army
Staff Officers
 Chief Inspector (Inspecteur-chef): four gold stripes; former insignia of a colonel in the Canadian Army
 Inspector (Inspecteur): three gold stripes; former insignia of a lieutenant-colonel in the Canadian Army
 Commander (Commandant): two and-a-half gold stripes; former insignia of a major in the Canadian Army
Superior Officers
 Lieutenant (Lieutenant): one and a-half gold stripes; former insignia of a lieutenant in the Canadian Army
Officers
 Sergeant: half gold stripe
Constables
 Senior Constable (Agent Sénior)
 Constable (Agent)
Source:

Operations
The SPVM covers an area of about 496 square kilometres and 1,958,000 residents of the island of Montreal.

There are 33 police stations that operate within four geographical regions: East, West, North and South.

Other units of the SPVM include:
 K-9 section
 Mounted unit
 Nautical patrol
 Crisis management
 Strategic planning
 Emergency Response Team (SWAT)
 Forensics
 Airport Unit at Montréal–Pierre Elliott Trudeau International Airport
 Montréal Metro Unit

Fleet

 Chevrolet Impala 9C1
 Dodge Charger Enforcer
 Ford Police Interceptor Sedan
 Ford Police Interceptor Utility
 Mitsubishi i-MiEV
 BMW R1200RT
 Harley-Davidson Electra-Glide
 Ford E-450 
 Ford F-150
 Ford F-450 Super Duty
 Ford Escape
 Ford Transit
 Dodge Grand Caravan 
 RAM 2500 Heavy Duty
 RAM 3500 Heavy Duty
 RAM Promaster
 Mercedes-Benz Sprinter
 Grumman Kurbmaster
 Freightliner M2-106
 Thunder-1 (armoured vehicle)
 Winnebago Adventurer

Equipment
The standard sidearm of the Montreal Police is the Glock 19. Remington 870 shotguns and FN P90 sub-machine guns are also stocked by the SPVM and its Emergency Response Team armory, but these long guns are rarely used.

Prior to the Glock 19 officers carried the Walther P99 9mm as the sidearm which replaced the .357 Magnum revolvers in the early 2000s.

Criticism
In 1986, Anthony Griffin, who was 19 and unarmed, was killed by SPVM police officer Allan Gosset. His death sparked protests.  

In 1988, José Carlos Garcia, 43, was killed by an SPVM officer leading to a Sûreté du Québec investigation and a coroner’s inquest. 

In 1990, Presley Leslie, 26, was killed at Thunderdome dance club by SPVM police leading to an inquiry. That same year, Jorge Chavarria-Reyes was shot by a plainclothes officer leading to a Sûreté du Québec investigation and a coroner’s inquest. 

In 1991, Fritzgerald Forbes died due to a heart attack following his arrest. Also in 1991, in a case of mistaken identity, 24 year-old Marcellus Francois was killed by Montreal police. A Sûreté du Québec investigation was held and two officers suspended on a short-term basis for misconduct. A lawsuit was launched by the family against the city of Montreal which was settled for $218,269.

In 1993, Trevor Kelley was shot by Montreal police leading to a Sûreté du Québec investigation.

In 1995, Martin Omar Suazo was shot by a Montreal police officer leading to a police ethics commission investigation which found the police officer responsible for improper use of a firearm and led to his short-term suspension. 

In 2001, 19-year-old Michael Kibbe fell to his death at a Montreal police station while trying to escape arrest. His parents called for a public inquiry and the case was eventually investigated by the Comité de déontologie policière.  

In 2004, Rohan Wilson died while in police custody leading to a coroner’s inquest. 

In 2005, Mohamed Anas Bennis was shot twice by Montreal police officers leading to the formation of the Justice for Anas Coalition. 

On 3 November 2005, the United Nations Human Rights Committee advised the Canadian government to allow an enquiry on the SPVM about its mass arrests tactic during political demonstrations. The tactic is a rapid encirclement of as many protesters as possible regardless of how they may have conducted themselves during the demonstration, and is argued to be a violation of their fundamental rights. According to Francis Dupuis-Déri, a political science professor at Université du Québec à Montréal, police officers employ this tactic because of a "deviance" radical political demonstrators pose to media, politicians and police officers themselves. 

In 2007, Quilem Registre died in a hospital four days afted being tasered several times by SPVM officers. Following his death, a coroner’s report called for better training of police officers and critiqued their use of the taser. 

In 2008, Fredy Villanueva was shot by SPVM Officer Jean-Loup Lapointe leading to multiple protests and increased public discourse about racial profiling. The SPVM was criticized in the aftermath of the August 10, 2008 riots, which started due to the shooting death of 18-year-old Villanueva by an officer who alleged that the immigrant was attacking him and his partner while they were arresting immigrant's older brother. He argued that he was trying to save his partner and himself by firing his Walther P99 service gun on the 18-year-old.

In 2011, Mario Hamel, a homeless man, was shot by Montreal police officers leading to criticism of SPVM training. 

In 2012, Farshad Mohammadi, was shot by SPVM officers resulting in a coroner’s report calling for increased training for officers regarding their treatment of those with mental illness as well as criticism of the police’s social profiling of homeless individuals. 

In 2012, the SPVM also came under criticism regarding their handling of the 2012 Quebec student protests.

A former Montreal police officer, Stéfanie Trudeau, also known popularly and in the media as Officer 728, was given a 12-month suspended sentence and ordered to do 60 hours of community service for assaulting a man in October 2012. The officer was found guilty of assault in February 2016 for using excessive force.

In 2014, Alain Magloire, a mentally ill and homeless individual, was killed during a police intervention leading to a Coroner’s inquest. 

In 2016, 46-year-old Bony Jean-Pierre, died following a police intervention in Montreal North leading to calls for change and a demonstration.  

In June 2016, the Quebec Minister of Public Security introduced an independent agency, the "Bureau des enquêtes indépendantes (BEI)", to be responsible for investigating "shootings, serious injuries and deaths stemming from police interventions". The selection of investigators was criticized for being composed of former members law enforcement. Eleven out of the eighteen members are former police officers, in addition to being "nearly 100 percent white and composed almost entirely of men". The structure of the agency itself was criticized for lacking independent powers, since the BEI "acts only at the request of the Minister of Public Security".

In 2017, 58-year-old Pierre Coriolan died after being shot, tasered, and hit by police officers. A coroner’s inquest found that police lacked sufficient de-escalation training. 

In 2018, 23-year-old Nicholas Gibbs was shot by a Montreal police officer resulting in protests.  

In 2019, a report commissioned by the city found that the SPVM are four to five times more likely to stop a racialized person than a white person.

In June 2020, the Defund the Police Coalition was formed in the aftermath of the police killings of George Floyd, Breonna Taylor, Chantal Moore, and Regis Korchinski-Paquet. The Coalition consists of over 80 groups. One of the Coalition’s demands is to reduce the SPVM budget by at least 50%.

In January 2021, the SPVM evoked controversy when they mistakenly arrested a Polytechnique Montréal professor in the Park Extension neighbourhood. The man spent six days in prison, before being cleared on charges of disarming and assaulting a police officer, while the actual suspect remains at large. This led to renewed calls for universal police body cameras.

See also
 Integrated Security Unit
 Police officer
 Royal Canadian Mounted Police
 Service de sécurité incendie de Montréal
 Sûreté du Québec
 Urgences-Santé

References

External links
 Official website
 Fraternité des policiers et policières de Montréal